'The Drowners' are a Swedish indie pop band active in the 1990s powerpop scene. They had a successful indie single with "Is there something on your mind" in 2000.

Members
 Bass – Jonas Bergqvist
 Drums – Andreas Persson
 Guitar – Leif Rehnström, Mikael Sundqvist
 Vocals, Piano – Magnus Vikström

Activity timeline
July 1993: Band play their first gig (Trastockfestivalen Sweden).

Jan 1996: First single "Teenager"  Substantial airplay in Sweden.

Feb 1996: First album "Destroyer" Released in Sweden, Brazil, most of Asia and Germany.

May 1997: The single "Summer Break My Fall" is released to radio, and achieves chart placement in Aug, become their labels first charting record.

Sep 1997: 2nd album "World Record Player" released in most of Europe.

May 1998: First US gig in NYC.

Dec 1998: Signs with Wind-up in NYC.

Jun 1999: Move to LA and records an album with Producer Matt Hyde in Sound City Studios.

Jun 2000: Is There Something On Your Mind? album featuring re-recorded versions of songs from the previous two albums is released in America and becomes new and active on Billboard.

Oct 2002: "Muted to a Whisper" is released. Touring and festivals in USA.

July 2007: "Cease to Be" is released on CDBaby!

May 2008: Beautiful Escape: The Songs of The Posies Revisited is released including a track from The Drowners.

Dec 2008: X-mas single "My Candle" is released on band's original Swedish Label.

Discography
Happy New Year (single-09) A West Side Fabrication (SWE)
My Candle (single-08) A West Side Fabrication (SWE)
Beautiful Escape (tribute-08) Burning Sky Records (USA)
Cease To Be (album-07) Listening Post (USA)
Cease To Be Japan Version (album-07) 1977 Records (JAPAN)
Muted To A Whisper USA Version (album-03) Listening Post (USA)
Muted To A Whisper (album-02) Morphine Lane Records (SWE)
Best Of Beginnings (single-02) Morphine Lane Records (SWE)
He Was Fab (tribute-02) Jealousy Records (USA)
Jennifer (single-02) Morphine Lane Records (SWE)
On The Radio (single-01) Morphine Lane Records (SWE)
'Think Of Me': Boys & Girls (soundtrack-00) Ark 21 Records (USA)
Is There Something On Your Mind? (album-00) Wind Up Records (USA)
Is There Something On Your Mind? (single-00) Wind Up Records (USA)
What Comes Naturally (single-98) A West Side Fabrication (SWE)
Going For Gold (compilation-97) A West Side Fabrication (SWE)
'Fake R&R Personality' : Välkommen Till Festen (soundtrack-97) Startracks (SWE)
Fake R&R Personality (single-97) A West Side Fabrication (SWE)
World Record Player (album-97) A West Side Fabrication (SWE)
Summer Break My Fall (single-97) A West Side Fabrication (SWE)
'21' : West Side United (compilation-97) A West Side Fabrication (SWE)
Bumperstar (single-96) A West Side Fabrication (SWE)
'Upside' : Give Ear (compilation-96) A West Side Fabrication (SWE)
Stupid Way (single-96) A West Side Fabrication (SWE)
Destroyer (album-96) A West Side Fabrication (SWE)
Teenager (single-96) A West Side Fabrication (SWE)
'That Door' : The 23 Enigma (compilation-95) A West Side Fabrication (SWE)
'Destroyer' : Were All Part Of A Family (compilation-94) A West Side Fabrication (SWE)

References

External links
 Band Website http://www.thedrowners.com/
 Listing at Discogs https://www.discogs.com/artist/1326348-The-Drowners
 2009 interview at Diiver.com http://www.diiver.com/2009/10/29/the-drowners/
 Profile at Artists Trove http://www.artisttrove.com/artist/8473515517/The+Drowners

Swedish musical groups